Dianne Elaine Samar Necio (born March 9, 1992) is a Filipino beauty titleholder who represented the Philippines at the Miss International 2011 pageant. She was trained by beauty queen maker Rodgil Flores of Kagandahang Flores who also trained Miss International 2005, Precious Lara Quigaman. She topped the Online Voting and won the People's choice award. She was previously the 1st Runner-up in Binibining Pilipinas 2010.

Pageants
Necio joined Binibining Pilipinas 2011 and won the Binibining Pilipinas International title during the coronation night held at the Araneta Coliseum on April 10, 2011.

This victory entitled her to represent the Philippines at the Miss International 2011 pageant held in Chengdu, China, on November 6, 2011. In the pageant Necio won the People's Choice Award.

References

External links 

1992 births
Binibining Pilipinas winners
Miss International 2011 delegates
Star Magic
Living people
People from Albay